Alexander Sulzer (born May 30, 1984) is a German former professional ice hockey defenceman who played in the Deutsche Eishockey Liga (DEL) and National Hockey League (NHL).

Playing career
Born in Kaufbeuren, West Germany, Sulzer went through the youth system of the local ESV Kaufbeuren (ESVK). He first received ice time with the men's team in the third-tier Oberliga in 2000–01 as a sixteen-year-old. Two years later, in 2002–03, he split time between ESVK's team in the second-tier 2. Bundesliga and the Hamburg Freezers of the premiere Deutsche Eishockey Liga (DEL) under Förderlizenz. In the subsequent off-season, Sulzer was selected by the Nashville Predators in the third round of the 2003 NHL Entry Draft, 92nd overall.

Following his draft, Sulzer remained in the higher-profile DEL, transferring to the DEG Metro Stars. He spent four seasons with the Metro Stars, recording a DEL career-high 18 points (three goals and 15 assists) over 48 games in 2005–06. He also helped the team reach the playoff finals that year, recording 9 points over 13 post-season games.

On June 1, 2007, he signed a two-year contract with the Predators. Moving to North America, to begin playing within the Predators organization, he was assigned to the team's American Hockey League (AHL) affiliate, the Milwaukee Admirals, for the  2007–08 season. He recorded 32 points over 61 games as a rookie in the AHL. The following season, he improved to 34 points over 48 games with Milwaukee, while also earning his first NHL call-up, appearing in two games for the Predators. Sulzer became a more regular addition to the Predators' lineup in 2009–10, dressing for 20 NHL games, while also recording 30 points over 36 games in between call-ups.

Sulzer scored his first NHL goal on January 23, 2011 against Devan Dubnyk of the Edmonton Oilers. The following month, on February 25, he was traded to the Florida Panthers in exchange for a conditional draft pick. Splitting the season between the Predators and Panthers, he recorded 5 points over 40 games.

During the off-season, Sulzer became an unrestricted free agent. On July 7, 2011, he signed with the Vancouver Canucks. He made the team out of training camp, but was a healthy scratch for the first three weeks of the season before dressing for his first game as a Canuck on October 26, 2011. On NHL trade deadline day, Sulzer was dealt to the Buffalo Sabres, along with forward Cody Hodgson, in exchange for defenseman Marc-Andre Gragnani and forward Zack Kassian.

On May 21, 2012, the Buffalo Sabres re-signed Sulzer to a one-year contract extension worth $725,000. In explaining the extension to media gathered at First Niagara Center, GM Darcy Regier said, "(Sulzer) played very well with Christian (Ehrhoff). And I think the other thing you really notice out there is his composure; his ability to not only break up plays defensively, but to make plays offensively with the patience that he showed. We were pleasantly surprised with his play, and that moved us toward getting him signed."

For the 2013–14 season, Sulzer spent 25 games with the Sabres and 10 games (mostly at the beginning of the season) with the Rochester Americans of the American Hockey League. He sustained a concussion on March 13 and missed the remainder of the season.

Sulzer signed a five-year contract with Kölner Haie on May 1, 2014.

At the conclusion of his contract in Cologne, Sulzer opted to leave as a free agent and return to former club, Düsseldorfer EG, then known as the Metro Stars, signing a one-year contract on May 9, 2019. Prior to the 2019–20 season, Sulzer was diagnosed with a tumour in the vicinity of his cervical spine. The benign tumour was completely removed during an operation in August 2019, and he effectively ended his 19 year professional career, announcing his retirement on September 4, 2020.

International play
Sulzer has played for the  German national team in the 2005 and 2006 World Championships, and at the 2006 Winter Olympics in Turin, as well as the 2010 Winter Olympics in Vancouver.

Career statistics

Regular season and playoffs

International

References

External links

 

1984 births
Living people
Buffalo Sabres players
DEG Metro Stars players
ERC Ingolstadt players
Florida Panthers players
Füchse Duisburg players
German ice hockey defencemen
Hamburg Freezers players
Ice hockey players at the 2006 Winter Olympics
Ice hockey players at the 2010 Winter Olympics
ESV Kaufbeuren players
Kölner Haie players
Milwaukee Admirals players
Nashville Predators draft picks
Nashville Predators players
Olympic ice hockey players of Germany
People from Kaufbeuren
Sportspeople from Swabia (Bavaria)
Rochester Americans players
Vancouver Canucks players